The Demons of Ludlow is a 1983 American horror film directed and produced by Bill Rebane. The plot revolves around murderous pilgrim demons that lurk inside an antique piano.

Plot

The town of Ludlow has a dark past and when a piano arrives, demons come out to terrorize.

Cast
 Paul Bentzen (as Paul Von Hausen) as Chris the Preacher
 Debra Dulman as Sybil
 Stephenie Cushna as Debra
 Mary Walden as Elenore
 Carol Perry as Ann
 Patricia J. Statz as Emily
 Angailica as Ludlows Daughter

Release

Home media
The Demons of Ludlow was released on DVD by Video International on March 17, 2008. It was also released on Blu-ray on June 1, 2020, as a part of Arrow Video's Weird Wisconsin: The Bill Rebane Collection boxset.

Reception

TV Guide awarded the film 2/5 stars, stating that the film had "Occasional unsettling moments, but [was] nothing special." Drew Beard from HorrorNews.net panned the film, criticizing the film's acting, lack of production values, and incoherence, stating: "The Demons of Ludlow will please only viewers with highly developed camp sensibilities".

References

External links
 
 
 

1983 films
1983 horror films
American supernatural horror films
American independent films
Demons in film
Films shot in Wisconsin
Films directed by Bill Rebane
1980s English-language films
1980s American films